Clonaghadoo is a village in County Laois, Ireland, located  north  of Mountmellick just off the N80 national secondary road. The Slieve Bloom Mountains lie southwest of the village.

Amenities
There is a Catholic church, school and a community hall. The hall was originally a Clonaghadoo National School, opened in 1912.
The name Clonaghadoo comes from Cluanacha Dubha, or the Black Meadows.

In the grounds of the church there is a labyrinth of low hedges and gravel paths.

See also
 List of towns and villages in Ireland

External links

Towns and villages in County Laois
Townlands of County Laois